Thabang Diamond Thopola (born 23 March 1990) is a South African soccer player who plays for Tshakhuma Tsha Madzivhandila.

References

1990 births
Living people
South African soccer players
South Africa international soccer players
People from Polokwane
Sportspeople from Limpopo
Association football defenders
Thanda Royal Zulu F.C. players
Chippa United F.C. players
Orlando Pirates F.C. players
Tshakhuma Tsha Madzivhandila F.C. players
South African Premier Division players